Ralph Clement Bryant, Sr. (22 January 1877 – February 1, 1939) was an early American professor of forestry, the author of the pioneer textbook and other books and notes in forestry. Logging (1913)

Education and career

R. C. Bryant was the first person to receive a forestry degree in the United States, as a graduate from the New York State College of Forestry at Cornell (1900, Forest Engineer degree).

His positions include: Forester of New York State Forest, Fish and Game Commission (1900–1901), Assistant Chief Forester of Philippine Bureau of Forestry (1902–1905), U.S. Forest Service (1905–1906), Professor of Lumbering, Yale University (1906–1939).

References

External links 

 Guide to the Ralph Clement Bryant Family Papers 1899

1877 births
1939 deaths
Forestry academics
American foresters
Filipino foresters
New York State College of Forestry
Cornell University alumni
Yale University faculty
History of forestry education
History of forestry in the United States
People from Princeton, Illinois